Syncope tridactyla is a species of frog in the family Microhylidae. It is found in the Amazon rainforest of Brazil, Peru, and Ecuador. 
Its natural habitat is tropical moist lowland forests. It is not present in modified habitats and is thereby locally threatened by habitat loss, but this is not considered to be a significant threat to the species as whole.

References

tridactyla
Amphibians of Brazil
Amphibians of Ecuador
Amphibians of Peru
Taxonomy articles created by Polbot
Amphibians described in 1995
Taxobox binomials not recognized by IUCN